Derks Field was a minor league baseball park in the western United States, located in Salt Lake City, Utah.  It was the home field of the Salt Lake Bees, Angels, and Gulls of the Pacific Coast League, Bees, Giants, and Trappers of the Pioneer Baseball League, and the Salt Lake Sting of the American Professional Soccer League. 

Opened in 1928 as Community Park, the ballpark's final seating capacity was 10,000. In 1940, it was named for Salt Lake Tribune sports editor John C. Derks (1873–1944). 

Derks Field had replaced the previous professional ballpark, Bonneville Park (originally called Majestic Park), which was south of 9th Street between State Street and Main Street, on the site of an amusement park called the Salt Palace, which had been destroyed by fire in 1910. It operated from 1915 through 1927. As part of the construction of the new Community Park, the Bonneville stands were taken down and reassembled at the new site.[Salt Lake Deseret News, September 25, 1946, p.3]

Destroyed by arson on the night of September 24, 1946, it reopened in May 1947, and was expanded in 1958 with the return of the PCL.

Major League Baseball teams occasionally played exhibition games at Derks Field, including the 1960 Pittsburgh Pirates and the 1964 Milwaukee Braves.

Its successor, Smith's Ballpark, opened on the same site  in 1994.

References

External links
 Salt Lake Tribune – Remembering Derks Field – Tom Wharton – July 5, 2012
Venue history
KTVX (ABC affiliate) – Wirth Watching: Salt Lake City's Baseball Palaces - Craig Wirth 
Baseball Reference – Salt Lake City minor league teams

Defunct minor league baseball venues
Defunct baseball venues in the United States
Sports venues in Salt Lake City
Defunct soccer venues in the United States
Soccer venues in Utah
Sports venues completed in 1947
Defunct sports venues in Utah
1947 establishments in Utah
1993 disestablishments in Utah
Utah Utes baseball